Heroes of the East, also known as Challenge of the Ninja, Shaolin vs. Ninja and Shaolin Challenges Ninja is a martial arts film produced in 1978. It starred Gordon Liu and was directed by Lau Kar-Leung. Lau Kar-Leung has a cameo role as So Chan, a master of Zui Quan. It's notable for portraying Japanese martial arts alongside the more typical kung fu used in most Hong Kong martial arts films.

Plot
In Shanghai about the 1930s, Ho Tao (Gordon Liu) is a kung fu student. His rich father has set up an arranged marriage for him with the daughter of a Japanese business associate. Ho Tao initially objects and feigns illness, but soon thereafter agrees to the marriage when he finds bride to be, Yumiko Kōda ("Kung Zi" in Mandarin), is attractive. After the wedding, he finds out that she is also a martial artist. Ho Tao finds her style of karate to be violent, unladylike, and potentially immodest and tries to persuade her to learn feminine but also effectual styles of Chinese kung fu. She is later offended during an argument over which nation has the superior martial arts styles and eventually goes back to Japan. When he travels to Japan to entreat Kung Zi to be reconciled with her husband, Ho Tao's father finds Kung Zi in training by her childhood friend and rather too attentive martial arts sensei Takeno.

As a ruse to bring her back to China, Ho Tao sends her a letter challenging Japanese martial arts and their inferiority to their Chinese roots. He hopes that the letter will infuriate Kung Zi enough to return to prove that her Japanese styles are as good as the Chinese ones. Once she is back in China, Ho Tao hopes to reconcile with her. But the plan backfires when Takeno reads the letter instead of Kung Zi. Takeno reads the challenge as an affront to Japanese martial arts and declares its contents with other Japanese martial arts masters who travels to China to take up Ho Tao's challenge.

Takeno informs Ho Tao that he will face a different martial arts expert every day.

In the first duel, Ho Tao misinterprets a respectful gesture from the Japanese fighter and thus further antagonizes the Japanese contingent. Due to this cultural misunderstanding, the Japanese no longer treat the subsequent duels as exhibitions of their styles but rather as all-out fights. Kung Zi, seeing the gravity of the situation, helps Ho Tao by warning him of Takeno's mastery of ninjutsu.

A series of duels follows, as Ho Tao comes up with a way to counter each Japanese martial artist’s specialist expertise. In a final showdown, Ho Tao faces Takeno.

Chow Kan (Cheng Hong-Yip), Ho Tao's servant, provides a lot of the comedic relief for the film through various schemes that often bring unintended consequences for Ho Tao.

Martial arts
The film is noted for the exhibitions of various martial-arts styles and weapons:
 Japanese Samurai Sword vs. Chinese Straight Sword (double-edged long sword) 
 Sino-Okinawan Karate vs. Chinese Drunken Fist
 Okinawan Bruce Lee's Nunchucks & Tonfa vs. Chinese Three sectional staff (melee weapons)
 Japanese Long Spear vs. Chinese Qiang (spears)
 Okinawan Tekpis vs. Chinese Wing Chun Butterfly Swords (short swords)
 Japanese Judo vs. peanut oil (a comedic duel)
 Japanese ninja skills Hensojutsu, Shinobi-iri vs. peanut shells (another comedic duel) 
 Japanese Ninja Star Darts, Darts vs. Chinese Needles, Sleeve Arrows (throwing weapons)
 Japanese Sickles as compared to Chinese Long Rope Dart (chained/roped weapons)
 Japanese Ninja Short Sword vs. Chinese Broadsword (single-edged broadsword/saber)
 Japanese Crab-style vs. Chinese Crane Fist

In a departure from the norm for a Hong Kong film of that time, instead of stereotyping the Japanese characters as villains, the film portrays both the Japanese characters and their fighting skills with respect.  Another unusual aspect of the film is that director Lau insisted that none of the fights ended in death. It is consistent with Lau's insistence on no characters being killed when in the film, Ho Tao criticizes the lethal technique of Ninjitsu as being dishonorable. He refers to it as an "ambush" only used by "treacherous criminals", and by contrast "the way of (Chinese) kung fu emphasizes on being fair and open". (All quotes were taken from the subtitle translation used on the Celestial Pictures/IVL DVD release.  The English dubbed version, usually titled Shaolin Challenges Ninja, is even more harsh in its assessment of Ninjutsu, with Ho Tao referring to it as "murder" instead of "ambush".)

Cast
 Gordon Liu - Ho Tao, the main protagonist, Yumiko Kōda's husband and Kung fu fighter
 Yuka Mizuno - Yumiko "Kung Zi" Kōda, the female protagonist, Ho Tao's japanese wife from Kyoto, Japan and Japanese martial arts fighter
 Yasuaki Kurata - Takeno, Japanese ninjutsu expert
 Naozō Katō - Japanese Master
 Riki Harada (English credits say Takeshi Yamamoto) - Japanese Iaido expert
 Yūjirō Sumi (English credits say Tetsu Sumi) - Karate expert
 Hayato Ryūzaki (English credits say Manabu Shirai) - Nunchaku expert
 Yasutaka Nakazaki - Japanese Sai expert
 Hitoshi Ōmae - Japanese judo expert
 Nobuo Yana - Japanese Sōjutsu expert
 Lau Kar-leung - Drunken master So
 Cheng Hong-Yip - Chow Kan
 Ching Miao - Ho Tao's father
 Norman Chui - Chang
 Hoi Sang Lee - Bald pupil
 Yuen Siu Tien - Ho Tao's teacher

Home media
Dragon Dynasty released the DVD in North America on 27 May 2008. Paramount Pictures released the Blu-ray in Japan on 7 June 2013.

See also
 List of Hong Kong films
 List of martial arts films

References

External links
 
 review at lovehkfilm.com
 review at kungfucinema.com with nice screen shots
 review at hkcinema.co.uk
 HKMDB entry

1978 films
1978 action films
1978 martial arts films
Films directed by Lau Kar-leung
Hong Kong martial arts films
Japan in non-Japanese culture
Kung fu films
Mandarin-language films
Second Sino-Japanese War films
Shaw Brothers Studio films
1970s Hong Kong films